Jeshurun ( Yəšurūn; also Jesurun  or Yeshurun) is a poetic name for Israel used in the Tanakh or Hebrew Bible. It is generally thought to be derived from a root word meaning upright, just or straight, but may have been derived from שׁור, shur, to see, or may be a diminutive form of the word Israel (יִשְׂרָאֵל Yiśrāʾēl).

Biblical accounts
Jeshurun appears four times in the Hebrew Bible: three times in Deuteronomy and once in Isaiah. It can refer to the people of Israel ( 33:26), the Land of Israel, or the Patriarch Jacob (whom an angel renamed Israel in ):
 'But Jeshurun grew fat and kicked; you grew fat, you grew thick'.
 'Moses commanded a law for us, a heritage of the congregation of Jacob. He was King in Jeshurun, when the leaders of the people were gathered, all the tribes of Israel together'.
 'There is no one like the God of Jeshurun, who rides the heavens to help you'.
 ‘Fear not, O Jacob My servant, and thou, Jeshurun, whom I have chosen'. (Isaiah 44:2).

The word Jeshurun may have a relationship to the same root as the Hebrew word meaning 'upright' or 'righteous', yashar. Numbers appears to use the word yashar (in its plural form yesharim) as a play on the word "Jeshurun" to refer to the people of Israel..  refers to a Book of Jasher (or Book of Jashar), translated in some versions as "the Book of the Upright".

Classical interpretation
In the Midrash, Rabbi Berekiah in the name of Rabbi Simon interpreted Jeshurun to mean the Patriarch Israel. (Genesis Rabbah 77:1.) Similarly, Rabbi Berekiah in the name of Rabbi Judah b. Rabbi Simon interpreted Jeshurun to mean "the noblest and best among you." (Genesis Rabbah 77:1.)

Rabbi Aha bar Jacob told that the breastplate of the High Priest (or Kohen Gadol) contained the Hebrew words for "The tribes of Jeshurun," thus supplying the otherwise missing Hebrew letter tet in the word "Shivtei" ("tribes"). (See Babylonian Talmud Yoma 73b for full explanation of "otherwise missing"; see also Exodus Rabbah 38:9.)

In the Zohar, Rabbi Hiya explains that "Jeshurun suggests the word shur [row, side] and indicates that he [Jacob] has his rank on this side and on the other." (Zohar 1:177b.)

In the Chassidic discourses of the Baal Shem Tov and his students, it is suggested that the word Yeshurun comes from the root "shir", meaning song or ring, suggesting the circular nature of melodies, i.e. that Jacob's descendants will sing mystical melodies in the coming redemption.

Modern interpretation
The Reformer John Calvin reflected that "by using the word 'upright' for Israel, [the author] ironically taunts them with having departed from rectitude, and, reminding them of the high dignity conferred upon them, more severely reproves their sin of unfaithfulness".

Nineteenth century theologian Charles H. Waller argued that "Jeshurun is a diminutive—a term of endearment: either 'the child of the upright', or 'the beloved Israel'". He suggested that "the letters of the diminutive of Israel, if slightly abbreviated, would make 'Jeshurun'". However, Joseph Benson noted that "some consider the word as being derived from שׁור, shur, to see, and think the appellation was given them because they were so highly favoured with divine manifestations". Benson himself dismissed this view, suggesting that "it is much more probable that it is derived from ישׁר, jashar, to be right, upright, or righteous, and that they are called Jeshurun, because they were a people professing righteousness, and were governed by righteous laws".

References

Hebrew words and phrases in the Hebrew Bible